Manuel Turchi (born 27 January 1981 in Rome) is a retired Italian professional football playing most of his career at Virtus Lanciano 1924

Career 
He played in Roma Primavera until 2000, before his transfer to Virtus Lanciano.

In July 2004 he moved to Ostiamare. In the following summer he was bought by Padova.

In January 2008 he went to Pescara, where he collected only 8 appearances.

In July 2008 he returns to Virtus Lanciano. In 2011–2012 season he conquered the promotion from Lega Pro Prima Divisione to Serie B.

External links 

Italian footballers
S.S. Virtus Lanciano 1924 players
A.S. Ostia Mare Lido Calcio players
Calcio Padova players
Delfino Pescara 1936 players
Serie B players
Association football wingers
Footballers from Rome
1981 births
Living people